Mary Harper may refer to:
 Mary C. Harper, American educator and politician
 Mary Starke Harper, African American nurse 
 Mere Harper, also known as Mary, porter, cultural informant, and midwife of Kāi Tahu and Kāti Huirapa descent